Robert Julian Turner (born 25 November 1967 in  Malvern, Worcestershire) is an English former first-class cricketer. A right-handed wicketkeeper batsman, Turner started his career in 1988 with Cambridge University, whom he captained. He started playing with Somerset 3 years later and was their keeper until his retirement in 2005. He took 753 first-class dismissals in his 250-game career. Turner scored over 1000 runs in both 1997 and 1999.

During his career at Somerset he was not a full-time cricketer, but worked as a stockbroker for Rowan Dartington & Co Ltd which he joined full-time after his retirement from cricket.

Although he was never selected to play for England, Turner toured with the A team in Bangladesh and New Zealand during 1999/2000.

He is currently an A-Level Mathematics Teacher at Richard Huish College where he teaches mathematics. He also plays for Weston-super-Mare Cricket Club.

He has an older brother Simon who also played for Somerset between 1984 and 1985. He now plays for Weston-super-Mare Cricket Club as well as Axbridge Cricket Club where he lives.

References

1967 births
Living people
English cricketers
Cambridge University cricketers
Cambridgeshire cricketers
Somerset cricketers
Oxford and Cambridge Universities cricketers
People educated at Millfield
People from Malvern, Worcestershire
Alumni of Magdalene College, Cambridge
Schoolteachers from Worcestershire
British Universities cricketers
Wicket-keepers